Pius Michaud (August 28, 1870 – July 5, 1956) was a Canadian lawyer and politician who served in the House of Commons of Canada. He represented the electoral district of Victoria from 1907 to 1917, and Restigouche—Madawaska from 1917 to 1925, as a member of the Liberal Party.

He was the son of Felix Michaud and Marguerite H. Violette and was educated at St. Joseph's College. In 1899, he married Marie Hebert. Michaud served as secretary-treasurer for the council for Madawaska County. He lived in Edmundston.

He won the riding of Victoria by acclamation in 1907, following the appointment of John Costigan to the Senate, and was reelected in the 1908 and 1911 elections. He was subsequently re-elected in the redistributed riding of Restigouche—Madawaska in the 1917 and 1921 elections, but was defeated by Arthur Culligan of the Conservatives in the 1925 election.

References 

1870 births
1956 deaths
Liberal Party of Canada MPs
Members of the House of Commons of Canada from New Brunswick
People from Victoria County, New Brunswick
People from Madawaska County, New Brunswick
Acadian people